Newton is a village in the civil parish of Dalton Town with Newton, in the Barrow-in-Furness district, in the county of Cumbria, England. It is located on the Furness peninsula north-east of the port of Barrow-in-Furness and south of the town of Dalton-in-Furness.

Newton was listed in the Domesday Book as being one of the vills or townships forming the Manor of Hougun which was held by Tostig Godwinson, Earl of Northumbria.

GB News presenter Steve Dixon was born in the village, as was Richard T. Slone, a painter. Both were in the same year at school and were educated firstly in Newton and then in Dalton-in-Furness.

See also 
 Listed buildings in Dalton Town with Newton

References

External links 

 
Villages in Cumbria
Furness
Districts of Barrow-in-Furness